Antonio de Jesús Taboada Herrera (born September 11, 1967, in Mexico City, Mexico), known as Antonio Taboada, is an Argentinean football manager and former player.

External links 
 

1967 births
Living people
Mexican football managers
Footballers from Mexico City
Liga MX players
Mexican footballers
Association footballers not categorized by position